Expert Opinion on Investigational Drugs is a monthly peer-reviewed medical journal covering developments in pharmaceutical research, from animal studies through to early clinical investigation. The journal's scope includes therapeutics in many areas: pulmonary-allergy, dermatology, gastrointestinal, arthritis, infectious disorders, endocrine and metabolic, central and peripheral nervous system, cardiovascular and renal, and oncology.

The journal was established by Current Drugs in 1992, under the title Current Opinion in Investigational Drugs. In 1994, the journal was acquired by Ashley Publications, who published it until 2015, when it was acquired by Taylor & Francis. The current Editor-in-Chief is Giuseppe Tonini (University Campus Bio-Medico). According to the Journal Citation Reports has a 2014 impact factor of 5.528. It is also indexed in MEDLINE. The journal is available online and in paper format.

Pharmacology journals
Monthly journals
Publications established in 1992
English-language journals
Expert Opinion journals